Alaska Central Express is an airline based at Ted Stevens Anchorage International Airport in Anchorage, Alaska, United States.  It is a cargo and small package express service.

History 
The airline was established as Yutana Airlines in 1987 and renamed to Alaska Central Express in 1994 when the certificate was bought from the Part 135 in Fairbanks, Alaska.

Much of the original pilots, staff, mechanics, and equipment including three Raytheon Beechcraft 1900Cs came from MarkAir Express, a subsidiary of the bankrupt MarkAir. In 2007 with the purchase of a Beech 1900C (N115AX) combi passenger/cargo, ACE Air Cargo began charter passenger flights. Alaska Central Express, as of 2020, owns fifteen airplanes with plans for future expansion.

Destinations 
Alaska Central Express operates freight services to the following domestic scheduled destinations (at January 2005): Anchorage, Aniak, Atmautluak, Bethel, Chefornak, Chevak, Cold Bay, Dillingham, Dutch Harbor, Eek, Hooper Bay, Juneau, Ketchikan, King Salmon, Kipnuk, Kodiak, Kongiganak, Kwigillingok, Marshall, Newtok, Nightmute, Petersburg, Port Heiden, Quinhagak, Sand Point, Scammon Bay, Sitka, St George Island, St Paul Island, Togiak, Toksook Bay, Tuntutuliak, Tununak, Wrangell and Yakutat.

Fleet 

The Alaska Central Express fleet consists of the following aircraft (as of March 2014):

On 7 July 2020, ACE acquired eight Beechraft planes at Ravn Alaska's bankruptcy auction.

Accidents and incidents

On 22 January 2010, Alaska Central Express Flight 22 crashed in the sea off the end of the runway seconds after taking off at Sand Point airport, killing both crew members.

On 8 March 2013, ACE Beech 1900C (N116AX) operating as Flight 51 from King Salmon (PAKN) to Dillingham (PADL) crashed near the Muklung Hills-Aleknagik. The only two persons on board, the captain and copilot, were killed.

See also
List of airlines in Alaska

References

External links

 Alaska Central Express

Airlines established in 1994
Airlines based in Alaska
Companies based in Anchorage, Alaska
Regional airlines of the United States
1994 establishments in Alaska
Cargo airlines of the United States